Soot tattoos are carbon stains made by inserting soot into the dermis layer of the skin via a drug injection. A drug user may try to sterilize the tip of a needle with a flame, leaving a small amount of soot on the outside of the needle. An injection can carry this residual carbon into the skin, leaving a mark known as a soot tattoo.

Soot tattoos are an accidental cutaneous condition. This is distinct from the intentional practice of a tattoo artist creating a tattoo with a design in the skin using soot as a pigment in tattoo ink.

See also 
 List of cutaneous conditions

References 

Skin conditions resulting from physical factors